Chayanne es mi Nombre is the debut studio album recorded by Puerto Rican performer Chayanne, after he left Los Chicos. It was released by RCA Ariola in 1984. The album was produced by José Antonio Álvarez Alija.

Track listing

Music videos
Chayanne Es Mi Nombre
...¿Y Qué Culpa Tengo Yo?

References

1984 debut albums
Chayanne albums
Spanish-language albums
RCA Records albums